Plestiodon is a genus of lizards in the family Scincidae (skinks). The genus contains many species formerly classified under the genus Eumeces, except those now placed in Mesoscincus. They are secretive, agile animals with a cylindrical body covered with smooth, shiny scales. They are distributed from East Asia to throughout North America from southern Canada south to Mexico, including oceanic islands such as Bermuda.

Defensive mechanism
The conspicuous coloring of species of Plestiodon is a survival trait: it attracts a predator's attention to the tail of the animal, which will break off when grabbed. A skink thus often manages to escape and hide under some rock, log, or fallen leaves while the predator still contemplates the wildly thrashing severed tail. (This is an instance of what is called autotomy: voluntarily shedding a body part in order to escape, and later re generating the body part.) After the tail regenerates, it usually has the same color as the rest of the body and is typically shorter than the original tail. In some species, regrown tails are pinkish. A regrown tail has a cartilaginous rod for support instead of vertebrae.

Reproduction
Plestiodon are all oviparous. The female lays eggs once a year after the breeding season in spring. The clutch size varies and is typically around 5 to 10 eggs. The hatchlings appear in late summer.

Thermoregulation
Like other reptiles, Plestiodon skinks are "cold-blooded" — they are ectothermic animals: their metabolism cannot regulate their body temperature. To warm up, they often bask in the sun. In colder climates, they hibernate in winter in burrows below the frost line. In hot climates, they are active mainly in the morning and evening, staying under cover during the hottest hours of the day to avoid overheating.

Systematics
Recently two taxonomic revisions have been made regarding the 19th century genus Eumeces. They both resulted in similar results; the genus is paraphyletic and must be "sliced up" into several different genera. Griffith et al. (2000) proposed that the type species for Eumeces, E. pavimentatus, which is considered by many to be a subspecies of Eumeces schneiderii, should be changed to Lacerta fasciata, so that the genus name Eumeces would stay with the most species-rich clade. However this petition has not been verified by the International Commission on Zoological Nomenclature. Schmitz et al. argued that Griffith et al. violated the Code and rejected the proposal on good grounds. Thus only the African species of the Eumeces schneiderii group still belong to the genus Eumeces.

Species that are now in Plestiodon:

Plestiodon anthracinus  – coal skink
Plestiodon barbouri  – Barbour's eyelid skink 
Plestiodon bilineatus  – two-lined short-nosed skink
Plestiodon brevirostris  – short-nosed skink
Plestiodon callicephalus  – mountain skink
Plestiodon capito  – Gail's eyelid skink
Plestiodon chinensis  –Chinese blue-tailed skink 
Plestiodon colimensis  – Colima skink
Plestiodon copei  – Cope's skink
Plestiodon coreensis  – Smith's skink
Plestiodon dicei  – Dice's short-nosed skink
Plestiodon dugesii  – Dugès's skink 
Plestiodon egregius  – mole skink
Plestiodon elegans  – five-striped blue-tailed skink, Shanghai elegant skink 
Plestiodon fasciatus  – five-lined skink
Plestiodon finitimus  – Far Eastern skink
Plestiodon gilberti  – Gilbert's skink 
Plestiodon indubitus  – Mexican short-nosed skink
Plestiodon inexpectatus  – southeastern five-lined skink
Plestiodon japonicus  
Plestiodon kishinouyei  – Kishinouye's giant skink
Plestiodon kuchinoshimensis 
Plestiodon lagunensis  – San Lucan skink
Plestiodon laticeps  – broad-headed skink
Plestiodon latiscutatus  – Far Eastern skink, Japanese five-lined skink  

Plestiodon leucostictus  – Chinese blue-tailed skink
Plestiodon liui  – (Asia)
Plestiodon longirostris  – Bermuda skink, longnose skink, Bermuda rock lizard
Plestiodon longiartus  – (Guerrero, Mexico)
Plestiodon lotus 
Plestiodon lynxe  – oak forest skink 
Plestiodon marginatus  – Ousima skink, Okinawa blue-tailed skink
Plestiodon multilineatus  – Chihuahuan skink
Plestiodon multivirgatus  – many-lined skink
Plestiodon nietoi 
Plestiodon obsoletus  – Great Plains skink
Plestiodon ochoterenae  – Guerreran skink
Plestiodon oshimensis  – Ousima skink
Plestiodon parviauriculatus  – northern pygmy skink
Plestiodon parvulus  – southern pygmy skink
Plestiodon popei  – Pope's skink
Plestiodon quadrilineatus  – Hong Kong skink, four-striped skink
Plestiodon reynoldsi  – Florida sand skink
Plestiodon septentrionalis  – prairie skink 
Plestiodon skiltonianus  – western skink
Plestiodon stimpsonii  – Stimpson's skink
Plestiodon sumichrasti  – Sumichrast's skink
Plestiodon takarai  – Senkaku skink
Plestiodon tamdaoensis  – Vietnam skink
Plestiodon tetragrammus  – four-lined skink
Plestiodon tunganus 

Nota bene: A binomial authority in parentheses indicates that the species was originally described in a genus other than Plestiodon.

Species that are now in Eurylepis:
Eumeces poonaensis – now Eurylepis poonaensis
Eumeces taeniolatus – now Eurylepis taeniolata

Species that are now in Mesoscincus:
Eumeces altamirani – now Mesoscincus altamirani
Eumeces managuae – now Mesoscincus managuae
Eumeces schwartzei – now Mesoscincus schwartzei

Plestiodon brevirostris group
The Plestiodon brevirostris group consists of 14 species.

Plestiodon bilineatus, Plestiodon copei, Plestiodon dicei, Plestiodon dugesii, Plestiodon indubitus, Plestiodon lynxe, and Plestiodon parviauriculatus – highlands of the central Mexican Plateau, Sierra Madre Occidental, Sierra Madre Oriental, and Trans-Mexican Volcanic Belt
Plestiodon lotus – Balsas Basin
Plestiodon colimensis and Plestiodon parvulus – Pacific lowlands from northwestern Michoacán to Sonora
Plestiodon sumichrasti – the Atlantic versant from central Veracruz south and east through northern Guatemala and Belize to Honduras
Plestiodon brevirostris – Sierra Madre del Sur
Plestiodon nietoi and Plestiodon ochoterenae – Sierra Madre del Sur, in south-central Guerrero and from central Guerrero to western Oaxaca

References

Further reading
Austin JJ, Arnold EN (2006). "Using ancient and recent DNA to explore relationships of extinct and endangered Leiolopisma skinks (Reptilia: Scincidae) in the Mascarene islands". Molecular Phylogenetics and Evolution 39 (2): 503–511.  (HTML abstract)
Griffith H, Ngo A, Murphy RW (2000). "A cladistic evaluation of the cosmopolitan genus Eumeces Wiegmann (Reptilia, Squamata, Scincidae)". Russian J. Herpetol. 7 (1): 1-16. 
Schmitz, Andreas; Mausfeld, Patrick; Embert, Dirk (2004). "Molecular studies on the genus Eumeces Wiegmann, 1834: phylogenetic relationships and taxonomic implications". Hamadryad 28 (1-2): 73–89.  
Smith HM (2005). "Plestiodon: a Replacement Name for Most Members of the Genus Eumeces in North America". Journal of Kansas Herpetology (14): 15-16. 
Brandley MC, Schmitz A, Reeder TW (2005). "Partitioned Bayesian analyses, partition choice, and the phylogenetic relationships of Scincid lizards". Systematic Biology 54 (3): 373-390. 
Okamoto, Taku; Motokawa, Junko; Toda, Mamoru; Hikida, Tsutomu (2006). "Parapatric distribution of the lizards, Plestiodon (formerly Eumeces) latiscutatus and P. japonicus (Reptilia: Scincidae) around the Izu Peninsula, central Japan, and its biogeographic implications". Zoological Science 23: 419-425.
Motokawa, Junko; Hikida, Tsutomu (2003). "Genetic variation and differentiation in the Japanese five-lined skink, Eumeces latiscutatus (Reptile: Squamata)". Zoological Science 20: 97-106.

External links 

 PLESTIODON: A replacement name for most members of the genus EUMECES in North America, .pdf
 International Commission on Zoological Nomenclature

 
Lizard genera
Taxa named by André Marie Constant Duméril
Taxa named by Gabriel Bibron